The 1966 Japan Series was the 17th edition of Nippon Professional Baseball's postseason championship series. It matched the Central League champion Yomiuri Giants against the Pacific League champion Nankai Hawks. This was a rematch of the previous year's Japan Series, which the Giants won. Yomiuri again defeated Nankai, this time in six games, to win their second consecutive championship.

Summary

See also
1966 World Series

References

Japan Series
Nankai Hawks
Yomiuri Giants
Japan Series
Japan Series
Japan Series